Kovanh Namthavixay (born 23 July 1987) is a Laotian footballer Manager, AFC A LICENSE who Head Coach for Lao Army FC in the Lao League 1. He is an international player.

References 

1987 births
Living people
Laotian footballers
Laos international footballers
Association football defenders
Lao Army F.C. players